Shizhuxian railway station (Shizhu County railway station) is a railway station in Shizhu County, Chongqing, People's Republic of China, on the Yuli Railway operated by the China Railway Corporation. The station opened on 28 December 2013.

Railway stations in Chongqing